Come On Come On is a 1992 album by Mary Chapin Carpenter.

Come On Come On and variants may also refer to:

Music
C'mon, C'mon (album), a 2002 album by Sheryl Crow, and the title track
"Come On Come On" (Little Birdy song), 2006
"Come On, Come On" (Smash Mouth song), 1999
"C'mon! C'mon!" (Bronski Beat song), 1986
"C'mon C'mon" (The Von Bondies song), 2004
"Come On Come On", a 1977 song by Cheap Trick from In Color
"Come On Come On", a 1965 B-side by The Esquires, also covered by The A-Bones in 1993
"Come On Come On", a 1966 B-side by Freddy Cannon
"Come On, Come On", a 1982 song by Billy Idol from his eponymous album.
"Come On, Come On", a 1991 song by The Black Sorrows
"Come On Come On", a 1992 song by Mary Chapin Carpenter from her album Come On Come On (1992)
"Come On Come On", a 1997 song by Sleeper
"C'mon C'mon", a 1958 single by Della Reese
"C'mon C'mon", a 1970 song by Slade released as B-side to "Shape of Things to Come"
"C'mon C'mon", a song by Def Leppard from their 2008 album Songs from the Sparkle Lounge
"C'mon, C'mon", a song by One Direction from their 2012 album Take Me Home

Other
C'mon C'mon (film), a 2021 American drama film

See also
C'mon (disambiguation)
Come On (disambiguation)
"Come On, Come In", 1959 song by Carmen McRae
"Come On, Come On", refrain chanted by the crowd to Gary Glitter's "I'm the Leader of the Gang (I Am)"
“Please Please Me”, which includes the refrain come on, come on before the chorus.